The Uganda men's national under-18 basketball team is a national basketball team of Uganda, administered by the Federation of Uganda Basketball Association.
It represents the country in international under-18 (under age 18) basketball competitions.

See also
Uganda men's national basketball team
Uganda women's national under-18 basketball team

References

External links
Archived records of Uganda team participations

Uganda national basketball team
Men's national under-18 basketball teams